Lee Graham (born Graham Pulleyblank, 2 July 1939), better known by his stage name Leapy Lee, is an English singer, best known for his 1968 single "Little Arrows," which reached No. 2 in the UK Singles Chart, and was a Top 20 country and pop hit in the United States and Canada.

Career
The song "Little Arrows", written by Albert Hammond and Mike Hazlewood, was also the title track of his first album, released in 1968 on Decca Records. It reached No. 71 in the Billboard 200 album chart. (1951) uncredited vocal ^ : put your hand in your pocket (lyrics:Andy Forsythe)/ now .

"Little Arrows", released in the UK by MCA Records, became a hit,  reaching No. 2 in the charts. In the US, the record reached No. 16 on the Billboard Hot 100 chart and No. 11 on the country chart. The record made No. 1 on the Canadian country music chart. It sold over three million copies worldwide, and was awarded a gold disc.
Although he never reached the US pop charts again, Lee had two more country hits there with "Good Morning" in 1970 and "Every Road Leads Back To You" in 1975.

Between 1999 and 2001, Lee and his family (notably the twins in later editions), featured prominently in the BBC television series Passport to the Sun, fronted firstly by Liza Tarbuck then by Nadia Sawalha. Lee is a regular columnist with the Euro Weekly News, an English language newspaper based on the Costa del Sol in Spain.

Lee released a 40th anniversary EP, Little Arrows II, on 1 March 2010. In 2014 he appeared on the Channel 5 television show, OAPs Behaving Badly.

Personal life 
In July 1970, Lee was arrested after a pub brawl in which a relief manager was wounded. Lee was sentenced to three years for unlawful wounding, and his friend, Alan Lake, received eighteen months for his role in the brawl.

Discography

Albums

Singles

See also
List of 1960s one-hit wonders in the United States
List of NME covers
List of performers on Top of the Pops

Notes

References

External links
Leapy Lee biography at Oldies.com
 
 

1939 births
English pop singers
English country singers
English male singers
People from Eastbourne
Living people
Decca Records artists
Bell Records artists
MAM Records artists